Fagu was a poetry genre in early Gujarati literature.

Fagu may also refer to:

 Besim Fagu (1925–1999), Albanian footballer
 Erbim Fagu (born 1987), Albanian footballer

See also
 Fagu River (disambiguation)
 Fagus (disambiguation)